Ostružno may refer to places:

Bosnia and Herzegovina
Ostružno, Bosnia and Herzegovina, a village

Czech Republic
Ostružno (Jičín District), a  municipality and village in the Hradec Králové Region
Ostružno, a village and part of Borek (Havlíčkův Brod District) in the Vysočina Region
Ostružno, a village and part of Nezdice na Šumavě in the South Bohemian Region

See also
Ostružná